Armando Sensini (21 September 1909 - 21 October 1979)  was an Argentine athlete who competed in the 1948 Summer Olympics in the marathon, where he finished 9th.

References

External links
 

1909 births
1979 deaths
Athletes (track and field) at the 1948 Summer Olympics
Olympic athletes of Argentina
Argentine male marathon runners
Sportspeople from Bahía Blanca